Something to Believe is a 2007 EP album released by Chase Hampton.

Track listing 
 "Something To Believe" 
 "So Far For Love"
 "Nobody's Perfect"
 "Stayed The Weekend"
 "I Can't Pretend"
 "Movin' On"
 "Bus Driver" 
 "Goodbye"

Featured Musicians:
Chasen Hampton
Tony Lucca
Brian Wright
Deacon
C.C. White
David Goodstein
Sally Jaye
Martin Flores
Paul Allen
Dave Yaden
Mike Armstrong
Dickie Welch
Brando
Torrance Stonewall Jackson

2007 albums